The 1993–94 NBA season was the 24th season for the Portland Trail Blazers in the National Basketball Association. In the off-season, the Blazers acquired Harvey Grant from the Washington Bullets, and signed free agent Chris Dudley. However, an ankle injury limited Dudley only to just six games. The Blazers held a 27–20 record at the All-Star break, and finished the season with a 47–35 record, fourth in the Pacific Division and seventh in the Western Conference. It was their 12th straight trip to the postseason.

Last season's Sixth Man of the Year Clifford Robinson averaged 20.1 points, 6.7 rebounds and 1.4 blocks per game in his first season as a starter, while Clyde Drexler averaged 19.2 points, 6.5 rebounds, 4.9 assists and 1.4 steals per game, and Rod Strickland provided the team with 17.2 points, 9.0 assists and 1.8 steals per game. In addition, Terry Porter played most of the season off the bench as backup point guard behind Strickland, averaging 13.1 points and 5.2 assists per game, while Grant contributed 10.4 points per game, and Buck Williams provided with 9.7 points and 10.4 rebounds per game. Drexler and Robinson were both selected for the 1994 NBA All-Star Game.

The Blazers were knocked out of the playoffs in the Western Conference First Round by a 3–1 margin against the Houston Rockets. The Rockets would go on to defeat the New York Knicks in seven games in the NBA Finals, winning their first ever championship.

Game 4 of the Rockets-Blazers series would be the last playoff game Drexler would play as a member of the Trail Blazers, the team that drafted him. This was also his final full season with the Blazers, as he would be traded to the Rockets on February 14, 1995 (right before the next season's trade deadline), honoring his wish to be traded to a contender. Following the season, head coach Rick Adelman was fired.

NBA Draft

Roster

Regular season

Season standings

z – clinched division title
y – clinched division title
x – clinched playoff spot

Record vs. opponents

Game log

Playoffs

| home_wins = 1
| home_losses = 1
| road_wins = 0
| road_losses = 2
}}
|- align="center" bgcolor="#ffcccc"
| 1
| April 29
| @ Houston
| L 104–114
| Clyde Drexler (26)
| Clyde Drexler (13)
| Clyde Drexler (6)
| The Summit16,333
| 0–1
|- align="center" bgcolor="#ffcccc"
| 2
| May 1
| @ Houston
| L 104–115
| Clifford Robinson (28)
| Clyde Drexler (9)
| Rod Strickland (12)
| The Summit16,355
| 0–2
|- align="center" bgcolor="#ccffcc"
| 3
| May 3
| Houston
| W 118–115
| Rod Strickland (25)
| Robinson, Williams (10)
| Rod Strickland (15)
| Memorial Coliseum12,888
| 1–2
|- align="center" bgcolor="#ffcccc"
| 4
| May 6
| Houston
| L 89–92
| Rod Strickland (26)
| Clyde Drexler (13)
| Rod Strickland (7)
| Memorial Coliseum12,888
| 1–3
|-

Player statistics

NOTE: Please write the players statistics in alphabetical order by last name.

Season

Playoffs

Awards and honors
 Clyde Drexler, NBA All-Star
 Cliff Robinson, NBA All-Star

Transactions

References

Portland Trail Blazers seasons
Portland Trail Blazers 1993
Portland Trail Blazers 1994
Port
Port
Port